Tijana Bošković (born 8 March 1997) is a Serbian professional volleyball player of the Serbia women's national volleyball team. She has won gold with the national team at the 2018 World Championship, the 2022 World Championship, the 2017 European Championship, and the 2019 European Championship. She is a two-time Olympic medalist. She won silver at the 2016 Rio Olympic Games and bronze at the 2020 Tokyo Summer Olympics.

Bošković is left-handed and has been one of Serbia’s key players ever since her debut with the national team in 2014. By the age of 21, she had played in gold medal matches in all major tournaments (Olympic Games, World Championship and European Championship) and she was one of the players who has contributed a lot of winning points for Serbia.

Being selected as the 2019 European Volleyball Confederation Female Volleyball Player of the Year award, Bošković has recorded an impressive achievement by receiving that award for three consecutive years (2017, 2018, 2019).

She currently holds women's world record for serve speed of 111.4km/h.

During Eczacibasi-Conegliano match in the 2022 FIVB Club World Championship, Bošković broke her previous record for spike speed (110.3km/h) with 110.9km/h speed.

Career – National Team

Junior Team 
Bošković plays for Serbia junior team when she was 15 years old. She participated in the 2013 European Youth Olympic Festival and won a silver medal with the team. She was awarded as Most Valuable Player for the first time and named the Best Spiker of the tournament. She scored 29 points all alone for her team in the final match against Slovenia, but that was not enough to win gold medal. In 2014, she continued to represent Serbia's U19 national team at the 2014 Women's Junior European Volleyball Championship. The team won the championship and claimed the Junior European Champion title for the first time in their history after defeating Slovenia in an exciting five-setter match. It is also Serbia’s first gold medal in junior competitions. Bošković topped the scorers with 38 points and was selected as the Most Valuable Player of the tournament.

Senior Team

2014: Debut with Serbia women's national team 
At the age of 17, Bošković made her debut with the Serbia national team at the highest level, the 2014 FIVB Volleyball Women's World Championship. Although she was the youngest in the team, she was the top scorer for Serbia in most matches and scored a total of 129 points in eight games. The team finished 7th in the tournament overall.

As one of the most inexperienced players, Bošković entered the tournament after winning the 2014 Women's Junior European Volleyball Championship in Estonia and Finland. Zoran Terzić, Serbia head coach said "She only practiced with the Serbia national team three or four days before the World Championship. Before that she was at the European Championship so there was no time". He added, "It was my plan to play with her at this Championship" and "I want to give her a chance because she deserves it and I want to prepare her for the European Championship next season and also the Olympic Games in 2016".

Joining the team only shortly before the beginning of the tournament, Bošković said she hadn't expected to be called for playing in the tournament. She added "I did not imagine that I would play at the World Championship", and "I'm very happy just for the fact that I'm here. It's for sure a wonderful experience for me and for my future".

2015-2016: First medal with national team, European Championship bronze medalist and Olympic Rio silver medalist 
Bošković got her first medal with the senior national team in 2015, when she took a silver at the 2015 FIVB Volleyball Women's World Cup held in Japan. The tournament was a qualification process for the Olympic Games. As a result, Serbia qualified for the 2016 Summer Olympics by being among top two ranked in the tournament. Being the top scorer for Serbia, the rising star Tijana Bošković scored 159 points overall with 48.70% successful spike.

Bošković made her first appearance in Women's European Volleyball Championship and won her first medal in major tournament, bronze at the 2015 Women's European Volleyball Championship.

A year later, Bošković and her team won silver at the 2016 Summer Olympics. Serbia won its first medal in Olympic Games. Bošković and Brankica Mihajlović had 20 and 22 points respectively, led the team to the final by beating the world number one team and the undefeated team in the tournament, United States women's national volleyball team in a thrilling five setter. 19 years old Bošković, a sensational talent and one of the main attackers for Serbia played an incredible tournament by being the top three best scorer in the tournament and top scorer for Serbia. She was also the top two server after her teammate, Milena Rašić. Overall, Bošković had 10 aces and she records one of the fastest serve of the tournament with 100 km/h mark against China.

2017: Bronze in World Grand Prix and European Champion 
After a successful year in 2016, Bošković continued doing her best for Serbia in 2017 FIVB Volleyball World Grand Prix in Nanjing, China. The team won bronze medal against the host team, China. Scoring a total of 31 points against China, Bošković was named as the Best Opposite in the tournament.

In the 2017 Women's European Volleyball Championship, Bošković led her team to a victory over Netherlands women's national volleyball team to capture Serbia's second European title, undefeated. This was her first major title in senior national team and she was selected as the Most Valuable Player of the tournament. Tijana Bošković scored a total of 130 points, averaging 7.22 points per set, more than any other player in the competition.

Winning her first ever major title, Bošković said "We are European champions, this feeling is incredible! We played really well, like one, as a team from the beginning". She added, "We lost only two sets from the start of the European Championship. We worked five months for this and you can see the result". Anne Buijs, player of the Netherlands said, "We were completely ready but had many problems stopping Bošković and Mihajlović and we have to accept that the opponent was better today".

2018-2019: World Champion, back to back European Champion and Olympic Games Qualification 
In 2018, Bošković helped Serbia made history by claiming a maiden title at the 2018 FIVB Volleyball Women's World Championship. Serbian team defeated Italy women's national volleyball team in the final in a thrilling five sets game. This was her second World Championship and she was selected the Most Valuable Player of the tournament. She was once again the top scorer for Serbia with 193 total points and was the best spiker with 53.66% efficiency. Tijana Bošković’s attack on the sharp angle over high triple blocks with just a bump sets from libero and a spike speed of 102.7 km/h, gets applauded from Davide Mazzanti, Italy women’s national volleyball team head coach was the highlight of the final match.

Bošković and Serbia won their back to back European title at the 2019 Women's European Volleyball Championship. The team beat the host team, Turkey women's national volleyball team in a heart-stopping five set thriller and silenced the 10,000 home crowd in Ankara. Selected as the Best Opposite and Most Valuable Player of the tournament, Bošković is the second player, after Russia's Tatiana Kosheleva, to ever win the MVP award for the two times in a row.

During the Olympic Qualification Tournament 2019, Bošković scored 75 points in total of three match played, making her team qualify for the 2020 Summer Olympics.

2021: Olympic Tokyo bronze and European Championship silver medal 
In 2020, Bošković was included in Roster100 by International Volleyball Federation (FIVB) as one of the 100 most influential volleyball players between 2010 and 2020.

At the 2020 Summer Olympics, Bošković carried her team to win bronze medal. She became the first player to have scored 30 points or more in three different matches in an Olympic tournament. She did it twice in three sets, against Japan with 34 points and Korea with 33 points, but also adding 32 points in a four-set defeat to Brazil. She was the top scorer of the tournament with 192 points scored in eight matches, averaging a staggering 24 points per match. Bošković was also the Tokyo 2020 most efficient attacker, striking 165 from a whopping 313 swings for a 52.72% efficiency and top two server with 12 aces. Also she was the most defensive and made the most blocking as an Opposite Hitter of the tournament.

A month after 2020 Summer Olympics, Bošković repeated the individual Best Opposite award of the tournament as her team claimed silver at the 2021 Women's European Volleyball Championship. With this result, Serbia’s women volleyball national team is the only European team (men and women) to win medal in both Tokyo 2020 Olympic Games and 2021 European Championship. During the semi-final match against Turkey, Bošković broke the women's world record for spike speed of 110.3 km/h.

Bošković was chosen as the 4th place for The Best Player (women) of 2021 by volleyballworld.

2022: Back to back World Champion 
At 2022 FIVB World Championship, Bošković being the captain for the first time in her career for a senior national team and she led her team to retain the second World title. She was selected as the Most Valuable Player and Best Opposite of the tournament and she is the second player to win back to back World Championship MVP award after Cuba's Regla Torres, making her the only European player to achieve this feat. Bošković was Serbia's top scorer and the third best scorer with 240 points. She was also the most efficient attacker of the tournament, with 55.58% efficiency. In Serbia's first match against Canada women's national volleyball team, Bošković recorded the fastest serve in this edition with 106.8km/h speed.

Career – Club

2010-2015: ŽOK Hercegovac and ŽOK Partizan Vizura 
Bošković first club was ŽOK Hercegovac, a club from Bosnia and Herzegovina which she played in 2010-11. After playing for only one season with ŽOK Hercegovac, she transferred to ŽOK Partizan Vizura at the beginning of 2011-12 season. She left her family when she was only 14 years old and moved to Belgrade, the capital of Serbia. Bošković, who made her way, starts playing in the Serbian League. She has won two Serbian SuperLeague title (2013–14 and 2014–15), two Serbian SuperCup (2013 and 2014) and one Serbian Cup (2014–15). She was awarded as the best outside hitter at the 2012-13 Serbian Cup.

2015-present: Eczacıbaşı Dynavit 
Bošković ended cooperation with Partizan Vizura in 2015 and received many offers from the teams across Europe, mostly from Italy, Poland and Turkey. Being one of the most wanted players in transfer window, she had offers from all over the world, including VakifBank, Galatasaray and Fenerbahce. However, at the end she decided to play with one of the biggest club in volleyball, Eczacıbaşı Dynavit (at that time was Eczacıbaşı Vitra) and signed a four-year contract with the club. In 2016, UTSA Volleyball head coach, Laura Neugebauer-Groff said they tried to get her to play in America for a year with her sister, Dajana. Bošković, who already signed a four-year deals with Eczacıbaşı, has declined UTSA's offer and chose to stay in Turkey.

On 22 May 2018, Bošković still has a contract for one more season with Eczacıbaşı but she decided to extend her contract until the end of the 2020-2021 season. Despite receiving offers from clubs in China, Japan, Brazil, and other Turkish clubs, she chose to remain in her current club for three more season. In 2020-21 season, after the departure of team captain Kim Yeon-Koung, the team was led by two temporary captains, Bošković and Simge Akoz. While playing her 6th season with the Tigers, Eczacıbaşı announced that Bošković has renewed the contract with the team for two more years until the 2022-2023 season and she was appointed as the captain of the team. She has won seven trophies with Eczacıbaşı in total. She has won three Turkish SuperCup (2018, 2019 and 2020), two CEV Cup (2017–18 and 2021–22), one Turkish Cup (2018–19) and FIVB Club World Championship (2016).

Personal life 
Tijana Bošković was born on 8 March 1997 in Trebinje, Bosnia and Herzegovina. Bošković can speak three languages: Serbian, Turkish and English. She is the second child of Ljupko Bošković and Vesna Bošković. Her father was a football player. She has two siblings – a brother Vuk and a sister Dajana. Her younger brother, Vuk Bošković is a basketball player and her older sister Dajana Bošković plays for the national team of Bosnia and Herzegovina. The two sisters played their first international match against each other in 2021 Women's European Volleyball Championship. Dajana is also left-handed.

Bošković is Serbian from Bosnia and Herzegovina. She is not a naturalized player. She plays for Serbia since she was 15 years old. According to FIVB, naturalized players are supposed to wait for 2 years after they got a citizenship before they can play for the country they want to represent. Bošković didn’t have to wait for 2 years to play for Serbia, because she was already born as Serbian.

Bošković began her sports career with karate. She quit karate due to her tall stature and not being very prone to this sport. She found herself playing volleyball and basketball when it became clear that she would grow to be tall. One day she went to watch her older sister play volleyball and decided to become a volleyball player. She started playing volleyball during her primary school and she won three championship with her school team.

Before Bošković plays for Serbia junior team, she caught Galatasaray S.K. (women's volleyball)'s attention when she was playing in a match in Bosnia and Herzegovina. Galatasaray invited Bošković and her sister, Dajana to come to Istanbul, Turkey for trial training. Her father, Ljupko accepted the offer and comes to Istanbul with his daughters. After training with Galatasaray, Bošković, who was 12 years old at that time, is getting praised and appreciated by the coaches. Galatasaray managers met with her family and made a transfer offer. They offered to transfer Bošković to Turkish citizenship and play for the national team of Turkey. However, her father said she will not play for the national team of any other country other than the Serbia national team, rejects the offer and returns to Serbia with his daughters.

Awards

National Team

Junior Team
 2013 European Youth Olympic Fastival –  Silver Medal
 2014 Junior European Championship –  Gold Medal

Senior Team
 2015 World Cup –  Silver Medal
 2015 European Championship –  Bronze Medal
 2016 Olympic Games –  Silver Medal
 2017 World Grand Prix –  Bronze Medal
 2017 European Championship –  Gold Medal
 2018 World Championship –  Gold Medal
 2019 European Championship –  Gold Medal
 2020 Olympic Games –  Bronze Medal
 2021 European Championship  Silver Medal
 2022 World Championship –  Gold Medal

Club 
Serbian SuperCup
 2013 Serbian Super Cup –  Champion, with OK Partizan Vizura
 2014 Serbian Super Cup –  Champion, with OK Partizan Vizura
Serbian Cup
 2012-13 Serbian Cup –  Runner-Up, with OK Partizan Vizura
 2013-14 Serbian Cup –  Runner-Up, with OK Partizan Vizura
 2014-15 Serbian Cup –  Champion, with OK Partizan Vizura
Serbian SuperLeague
 2011-12 Serbian SuperLeague –  Third place, with OK Partizan Vizura
 2012-13 Serbian SuperLeague –  Third place, with OK Partizan Vizura
 2013-14 Serbia SuperLeague –  Champion, with OK Partizan Vizura
 2014-15 Serbia SuperLeague –  Champion, with OK Partizan Vizura
Turkish Super Cup
 2018 Spor Toto Champion's Cup –  Champion, with Eczacıbaşı VitrA
 2019 Spor Toto Champion's Cup –  Champion, with Eczacıbaşı VitrA
 2020 AXA Sigorta Champion's Cup –  Champion, with Eczacıbaşı VitrA
 2021 AXA Sigorta Champion's Cup –  Runner-Up, with Eczacıbaşı Dynavit
Turkish Cup
 2017-18 Volleyball Cup –  Runner-Up, with Eczacıbaşı VitrA
 2018-19 AXA Sigorta Volleyball Cup –  Champion, with Eczacıbaşı VitrA
 2020-21 AXA Sigorta Volleyball Cup –  Runner-Up, with Eczacıbaşı VitrA
Turkish League
 2015–16 Turkish Volleball League –  Third place, with Eczacıbaşı VitrA
 2017-18 Vestel Venus Sultanlar Ligi –  Runner-Up, with Eczacıbaşı VitrA
 2018-19 Vestel Venus Sultanlar Ligi –  Runner-Up, with Eczacıbaşı VitrA
 2021–22 Misli.com Sultanlar Ligi –  Third place, with Eczacıbaşı Dynavit
CEV Cup
 2017-18 Women's CEV Cup –  Champion, with Eczacıbaşı VitrA
 2021-22 Women's CEV Cup –  Champion, with Eczacıbaşı Dynavit
CEV Champions League
2016-17 CEV champion League –  Bronze Medal, with Eczacıbaşı VitrA
FIVB Volleyball Club World Championship
 2016 Club World Championship - Champion, with Eczacıbaşı VitrA
 2018 Club World Championship –  Bronze Medal, with Eczacıbaşı VitrA
 2019 Club World Championship –  Runner-Up, with Eczacıbaşı VitrA
 2022 Club World Championship –  Bronze Medal, with Eczacıbaşı Dynavit

Individual Awards (awarded)

National Team 
 2013 European Youth Olympic Festival "Most Valuable Player"
 2014 Junior European Championship "Most Valuable Player"
 2017 FIVB World Grand Prix "Best Opposite"
 2017 European Championship "Most Valuable Player"
 2018 World Championship "Most Valuable Player"
 2019 European Championship "Most Valuable Player"
 2019 European Championship "Best Opposite"
 2020 Summer Olympics "Best Opposite Spiker"
 2021 European Championship "Best Opposite"
 2022 World Championship "Most Valuable Player"
 2022 World Championship "Best Opposite"

Club 
 2016 FIVB Club world Championship "Most Valuable Player"
 2016 FIVB Club world Championship "Best Opposite"
 2016-17 Turkish League Regular Season "Best Opposite"
 2017 FIVB Club world Championship "Best Opposite"
 2017-18 Turkish League Regular Season "Best Opposite"
 2017-18 Women's CEV Cup "Most Valuable Player"
 2018 FIVB Club world Championship "Best Opposite"
 2018-19 Turkish Cup "Most Valuable Player"
 2018-19 Turkish League "Best Spiker"
 2019 Turkish Super Cup "Most Valuable Player"
 2019-20 Turkish League Regular Season "Best Opposite"
 2020 Turkish Super Cup "Most Valuable Player"

Additional individual awards (not awarded)

National Team 

 2013 European Youth Olympic Festival – Best Spiker
 2018 Nations League – Best Spiker
 2018 World Championship – Best Spiker
 2020 Summer Olympics – Best Scorer
 2020 Summer Olympics – Best Server
 2021 European Championship – Best Scorer
 2022 World Championship – Best Spiker

Club 

 2012-13 Serbian Cup – Best Outside Hitter
 2016-17 Women's CEV Champions League – Best Server
 2016-17 Women's CEV Champions League – Best Scorer
 2017-18 Women's CEV Cup – Best Scorer
 2017-18 Women's CEV Cup – Best Spiker
 2017 FIVB Club World Championship – Best Spiker
 2017 FIVB Club World Championship – Best Server
 2018-19 Turkish Cup – Best Scorer
 2018 FIVB Club World Championship – Best Spiker
 2019 FIVB Club World Championship – Best Server
 2020 Turkish Cup – Best Scorer
 2020-21 Turkish League Regular Season – Best Scorer
 2021-22 Women's CEV Cup – Best Scorer
 2022 FIVB Club World Championship - Best Server

Individual Achievements
 2014 OSS ( - Volleyball Federation of Serbia) Promising Female Volleyball Player of the Year
 2016 OSS Best Female Volleyball Player of the Year
 2017 OSS Best Female Volleyball Player of the Year
 2018 OSS Best Female Volleyball Player of the Year
 2019 OSS Best Female Volleyball Player of the Year
 2022 OSS Best Female Volleyball Player of the Year
 2017 Young Athlete of The Year by the Serbian Olympic Committee
 2018 Sport Woman of The Year by the Serbian Olympic Committee
 2019 Sport Woman of The Year by the Serbian Olympic Committee
 2022 Team Sport Athlete of The Year by the Serbian Olympic Committee
 2018 The best Athlete of the Republic of Srpska of the year
 2019 The best Athlete of the Republic of Srpska of the year
 2022 The Best Athlete of the Republic of Srpska of the Year
 2017 CEV Female Volleyball Player of the Year
 2018 CEV Female Volleyball Player of the Year
 2019 CEV Female Volleyball Player of the Year

References

1997 births
Living people
People from Trebinje
People from Bileća
Serbs of Bosnia and Herzegovina
Serbian women's volleyball players
European champions for Serbia
Volleyball players at the 2016 Summer Olympics
Olympic silver medalists for Serbia
Olympic medalists in volleyball
Medalists at the 2016 Summer Olympics
Olympic volleyball players of Serbia
Expatriate volleyball players in Turkey
Serbian expatriate sportspeople in Bosnia and Herzegovina
Eczacıbaşı volleyball players
Serbian expatriate sportspeople in Turkey
Volleyball players at the 2020 Summer Olympics
Medalists at the 2020 Summer Olympics
Olympic bronze medalists for Serbia